Tulelake is a city in northeastern Siskiyou County, California, United States. The town is named after nearby Tule Lake. Its population is 902 as of the 2020 census, down from 1,010 from the 2010 census.

Tulelake peace officers are authorized by state law, along with cooperation of the state of Oregon, to serve as and be recognized as peace officers within Malin, Oregon, along with the inverse being true for peace officers employed within Malin, wherein they are recognized as peace officers within Tulelake by the California Penal Code.

History
The first public auction of Tulelake land parcels took place on April 15, 1931. Over 100 lots were sold for prices ranging from $65 to $350. In 1937, the city was incorporated. Today there are over 400 housing units.

Two World War II internment camps were located near Tulelake. Camp Tulelake was an Italian and German prisoner-of-war camp to the west of town, located on Hill Road along Sheepy Ridge.  Also referred to as Gillems Bluff, Sheepy Ridge is a small range adjacent to Tule Lake.  The other internment camp housed nearly 18,000 Japanese Americans and Japanese alien residents and was in operation from May 1942 to March 1946.  The Tule Lake War Relocation Center was one of ten Japanese internment camps in the United States.  It was located approximately seven miles southeast of Tulelake. Today the western portion of the camp is occupied by the townsite of Newell.

Nightfire Island, an archeological site over 5000 years old, is west of Tule Lake along the shores of Indian Tom Lake.

Geography
Tulelake is located near the Siskiyou-Modoc County line. At the northwest corner of the Great Basin and Range.

Climate
Tulelake has a steppe climate (BSk) according to the Köppen climate classification system.

Demographics

2010
The 2010 United States Census reported that Tulelake had a population of 1,010. The racial makeup of Tulelake was 563 (55.7%) White, 1 (0.1%) African American, 15 (1.5%) Native American, 1 (0.1%) Asian, 0 (0.0%) Pacific Islander, 365 (36.1%) from other races, and 65 (6.4%) from two or more races. Hispanic or Latino of any race were 601 persons (59.5%).

The Census reported that 1,010 people (100% of the population) lived in households, 0 (0%) lived in non-institutionalized group quarters, and 0 (0%) were institutionalized.

There were 347 households, out of which 158 (45.5%) had children under the age of 18 living in them, 177 (51.0%) were opposite-sex married couples living together, 43 (12.4%) had a female householder with no husband present, 20 (5.8%) had a male householder with no wife present.  There were 24 (6.9%) unmarried opposite-sex partnerships, and 0 (0%) same-sex married couples or partnerships. 93 households (26.8%) were made up of individuals, and 43 (12.4%) had someone living alone who was 65 years of age or older. The average household size was 2.91.  There were 240 families (69.2% of all households); the average family size was 3.58.

The population was spread out, with 340 people (33.7%) under the age of 18, 102 people (10.1%) aged 18 to 24, 244 people (24.2%) aged 25 to 44, 222 people (22.0%) aged 45 to 64, and 102 people (10.1%) who were 65 years of age or older.  The median age was 29.4 years. For every 100 females, there were 102.4 males.  For every 100 females age 18 and over, there were 100.0 males.

The homeowner vacancy rate was 6.0%; the rental vacancy rate was 12.1%.  473 people (46.8% of the population) lived in owner-occupied housing units and 537 people (53.2%) lived in rental housing units.

2000
As of the census of 2000, there were 1,020 people, 358 households, and 255 families residing in the city. The racial makeup of the city was 71.76% White, 1.08% African American, 1.27% Native American, 0.29% Asian, 16.86% from other races, and 8.73% from two or more races. Hispanic or Latino of any race were 45.29% of the population.

There were 358 households, out of which 42.2% had children under the age of 18 living with them, 54.5% were married couples living together, 12.8% had a female householder with no husband present, and 28.5% were non-families. 25.1% of all households were made up of individuals, and 9.5% had someone living alone who was 65 years of age or older.  The average household size was 2.85 and the average family size was 3.48.

In the city, the population was spread out, with 35.8% under the age of 18, 8.1% from 18 to 24, 26.1% from 25 to 44, 18.3% from 45 to 64, and 11.7% who were 65 years of age or older.  The median age was 30 years. For every 100 females, there were 99.6 males.  For every 100 females age 18 and over, there were 96.1 males.

The median income for a household in the city was $23,750, and the median income for a family was $27,750. Males had a median income of $28,088 versus $22,500 for females. The per capita income for the city was $10,244.  About 33.7% of families and 34.6% of the population were below the poverty line, including 46.2% of those under age 18 and none of those age 65 or over.

As of July 2005 the population was estimated to be 1,010 (a -1.0% change).  There were estimated to be 509 males (49.9%) and 510 females(50.1%).  The population is broke up into a variety of ethnic groups; 51.6% were White Non-Hispanic, 45.3% Hispanic, 16.9% Other, 8.7% were two or more races, 3.1% American Indian, and 1.1% African American.

Government

Education
There are two schools in the Tulelake Basin Joint Unified School District, preschool through sixth grades are taught at Tulelake Elementary, where the mascot is the Gosling, a reflection of area waterfowl.  Tulelake High School, located in the town of Tulelake, instructs grades seven through twelve, and its mascot is the Honker, a slang term for the Canada goose.

Infrastructure
Tulelake has a municipal airport.

In popular culture
Tulelake is featured by Huell Howser in California's Gold Episode 204.

A goose and duck processing business and pillow factory in Tulelake was featured on an episode of Discovery Channel's series Dirty Jobs.

Mark Twain nicknamed his two-year-old girl Modoc due to her tantrums in reference to an incident in 1852 near Tule Lake where the Modoc destroyed an entire wagon train.

References

External links
Life inTulelake, California
 Life in Tulelake Basin
Tulelake Basin Joint Unified School District
Tulelake Chamber of Commerce

Cities in Siskiyou County, California
Incorporated cities and towns in California